Friends, released in 1971, is the fourth official album release by Elton John. It was a project John and Bernie Taupin took on before their breakout success in the US, and served as the soundtrack album for the Friends film released in the same year. It was certified Gold in April 1971 by the RIAA. It became John's third gold record in as many months in that market (following the albums Elton John in February and Tumbleweed Connection in March). The title track was a minor hit in the US (#34 on the pop chart) despite the film's poor performance. The album also received a 1972 Grammy nomination for Best Original Score Written for a Motion Picture.

The rights to the soundtrack are now with Universal Music Group, which shares ownership of John's music with him, and which also owns the Paramount Records catalogue.

Apart from the original vinyl release in 1971, it has yet to be issued as a standalone CD, but the Friends soundtrack is available on the Rare Masters (1992) 2-CD set, tracks 10–19 on Disc One, albeit with the tracks in a different order to the original LP.  The difference is that "Michelle's Song" changes places with "Honey Roll" and "Variations on Friends".

In the early 1970s, John performed the title track and "Can I Put You On" in concert, with the latter appearing on the next release, the live recording 17-11-70 (retitled 11-17-70 in North America). The most recent performance of "Friends" was in 1999.

Track listing 
All tracks written by Elton John and Bernie Taupin, except where noted.

Personnel 
Information taken from the original LP's liner notes.

Elton John – piano, vocals
Caleb Quaye – guitar ("Can I Put You On", "Honey Roll")
Barry Morgan—drums ("Friends", "Michelle's Song")
Dee Murray – bass guitar ("Can I Put You On", "Honey Roll")
Nigel Olsson – drums ("Can I Put You On", "Honey Roll")
Paul Buckmaster – orchestral arrangement
Rex Morris – saxophone ("Honey Roll")
Madeline Bell – backing vocals
Lesley Duncan – backing vocals
 Liza Strike - backing vocals

Production 
 Gus Dudgeon - producer
 Executive Producer - John Gilbert
 Engineer – Robin Geoffrey Cable

Charts

Certifications

References

External links

Romance film soundtracks
Albums produced by Gus Dudgeon
1971 soundtrack albums
Elton John soundtracks
Paramount Records (1969) soundtracks
Albums recorded at Trident Studios
Albums arranged by Paul Buckmaster
Single-artist film soundtracks